Aaron Richard Summers (born 1 March 1988) is an Australian speedway rider.

Career
Born in Adelaide, Summers first had success as a junior, winning the Australian Under-16 Solo Championship in 2004.

He began his British speedway career in 2007, riding for Buxton Hitmen in the Conference League and Edinburgh Monarchs in the Premier League. In his second season, he won the Premier League and the Premier Trophy with the Monarchs, also riding for Redcar Bears' Conference League team.

In 2009 he stayed with the Monarchs, and the following year rode for Birmingham Brummies in the Premier League and in the title-winning Coventry Bees Elite League team. In 2011 he began a four-year stay with Redcar Bears in the Premier League and in 2012 and 2013 returned to the Coventry Bees Elite League team. In 2015 he left the Bears and signed for Glasgow Tigers where he captained the team, doubling up in the Elite League with Swindon Robins and ending the season with a 6.82 Elite League CMA. He started the 2016 season with Tigers but with no Elite League place, but was signed by Leicester Lions in April to replace Grzegorz Walasek.

He rode for Berwick Bandits and Peterborough Panthers during 2019 and remained with Berwick for the 2021 season. In 2022, he rode for the Ipswich Witches in the SGB Premiership 2022 and also joined the Oxford Cheetahs for the SGB Championship 2022. The Cheetahs were returning to action after a 14-year absence from British Speedway.

Honours

Individual
Australian Under-16 Champion (2004)

Team
Premier Trophy (2008 - Edinburgh Monarchs)
Premier League (2008 - Edinburgh Monarchs)
Premier League Play-Off winner (2008, 2009 - Edinburgh Monarchs)  
Elite League (2010 - Coventry Bees)
Premier League Four-Team Championship (2010 - Birmingham Brummies)

References

1988 births
Living people
Australian speedway riders
Berwick Bandits riders
Birmingham Brummies riders
Coventry Bees riders
Edinburgh Monarchs riders
Glasgow Tigers riders
Leicester Lions riders
Oxford Cheetahs riders
Peterborough Panthers riders
Redcar Bears riders
Swindon Robins riders
Sportspeople from Adelaide